Kenneth Stanley Inglis,  (7 October 1929 – 1 December 2017) was an Australian historian.

Early life and education
Inglis was born in the Melbourne suburb of Ivanhoe, on 7 October 1929, the son of Stan and Rene Inglis. He was educated at Tyler Street Public School, Northcote Boys' High School and Melbourne High School, before going to study at the University of Melbourne. Inglis participated in the Student Christian Movement and amateur dramatics during his studies, and worked as a tutor at Ormond College. After graduating with a Bachelor of Arts with first class honours in History and English, he read for a Master of Arts at Melbourne. Inglis's thesis, which was a history of the Royal Melbourne Hospital, was later revised and published as his first book, Hospital and Community (Melbourne University Press, 1958).

Career

Inglis completed his Master's degree at the University of Melbourne and his doctorate at the University of Oxford. In 1956 he was appointed as a lecturer to the University of Adelaide. He subsequently became Professor of History at the Australian National University, and the University of Papua New Guinea.

Inglis wrote extensively on the Anzac tradition, the Stuart Case, war memorials, and the Australian Broadcasting Corporation. In 2008 he joined the Faculty of Arts at Monash University, Melbourne, as an Adjunct Professor.

Personal life

Inglis died, aged 88, on 1 December 2017 of pancreatic cancer.

His first wife, Judy Betharis, was an anthropologist who nurtured his interest in social, cultural and emotional communities. His younger sister was the medical anthropologist, Shirley Lindenbaum. After Judy’s tragic death in a car accident, Ken married Amirah Turner, a historian. The former Communist and one time Christian socialist, Amirah Inglis and Ken shared half a lifetime of scholarly collaboration and together had six children.

Awards
1999: The Age Book of the Year and Non-fiction Award for Sacred Places: War Memorials in the Australian Landscape.

The book also won the: 
NSW Premier's Literary Awards History Prize 1999
FAW Literature Award 1998
Ernest Scott History Prize 1999
Centre for Australian Cultural Studies Award, Individual Prize 1999.

Bibliography

References

Further reading 

 

1929 births
2017 deaths
Alumni of the University of Oxford
Australian historians
Academic staff of the Australian National University
Fellows of the Academy of the Social Sciences in Australia
Historians of Australia
Meanjin people
Officers of the Order of Australia
People educated at Melbourne High School
Recipients of the Centenary Medal
Academic staff of the University of Adelaide
University of Melbourne alumni
Academic staff of the University of Papua New Guinea
People from Ivanhoe, Victoria
Australian expatriates in Papua New Guinea